El Danane is a town in the north-central Mudug  region of Somalia.

References

El Danane, Somalia

Populated places in Mudug
puntland